Sibéal Ní Chasaide  (born 1998), known mononymously as Sibéal, is an Irish singer from the Ráth Chairn Gaeltacht, County Meath, specializing in the centuries-old melismatic Irish singing style of sean-nós. She is best known for her collaboration with  Patrick Cassidy singing his arrangement of Patrick Pearse's Mise Éire at the official government commemorations of the 1916 Rising.

Discography

Albums
 Sibéal (2019) No. 6 Irish Albums Chart

Live albums
 Sibéal – Live at Abbey Road Studios (2019)

Songs
 "The Parting Glass" (2018)
 "Human" (2019)
 Traditional: Carrickfergus (arr. Pacey) (2019)
Fuarú - with The Cranberries (Irish-language cover of Linger)

Filmography 

 "1916" (2016) - 3 episodes
 "1916 Centenary" (2016)
 "Ooops! The Adventure Continues" (2020)

References

External links
 
 
 Performance as soloist with Voces8 
 Clip of Sibeal Ni Chasaide - "Mise Éire" | The Late Late Show | RTÉ One

1998 births
21st-century Irish women singers
Living people
Musicians from County Meath
Sean-nós singers